Acanthocercus is a genus of lizards in the family Agamidae. The genus is endemic to Africa and the Arabian Peninsula.

Species

Nota bene: A binomial authority in parentheses indicates that the species was originally described in a genus other than Acanthocercus.

References

Further reading
 (1843). Systema Reptilium, Fasciculus Primus, Amblyglossae. Vienna: Braumüller & Seidel. 106 pp. + indices. (Acanthocercus, new genus, p. 84). (in Latin).

External links
 (2008): Animal Diversity Web - Genus Acanthocercus. Retrieved 2008-MAR-20.

 
Agamid lizards of Africa
Lizard genera
Taxa named by Leopold Fitzinger